Carlos Maria Elías y de la Quintana (September 18, 1841 – August 20, 1907) was a Peruvian diplomat and politician. He was born in Lima, Peru. He was a member of the Constitutional Party. He served in the Chamber of Deputies of Peru and Senate of Peru. He served as minister of foreign affairs and interior in the Government of Peru, as well as Minister to Argentina, Uruguay and Chile. He served twice as Prime Minister of Peru (September–October 1887, June 1892 – March 1893).

References
 Basadre Grohmann, Jorge: Historia de la República del Perú (1822 - 1933), Tomo 10. Editada por la Empresa Editora El Comercio S. A. Lima, 2005.  (V.10).
 Tauro del Pino, Alberto: Enciclopedia Ilustrada del Perú. Tercera Edición. Tomo 6, D’AC/FER. Lima, PEISA, 2001. 

People from Lima
Peruvian diplomats
Members of the Chamber of Deputies of Peru
Members of the Senate of Peru
Constitutional Party (Peru) politicians
Foreign ministers of Peru
Peruvian Ministers of Interior
1841 births
1907 deaths